Joseph C. O'Brien (born November 25, 1965) is an American politician and community organizer. He previously served as an at-large member of the Worcester, Massachusetts City Council and served as Mayor of Worcester, Massachusetts from 2010 to 2012.

Early life and education
O'Brien was born and raised in Worcester. He earned a B.A. in urban studies from Fordham University and a M.A. in public administration from Harvard University.

Professional career
After graduating from college, O'Brien worked as a community organizer in the Bronx and Worcester. He then spent the next decade working for non-profit organizations and in progressive politics. In 2001, O'Brien was elected to the Worcester School Committee. He served on the school committee for three two-year terms and led efforts to improve programs for at-risk students and to expand student health services. From 2003-2004 O'Brien worked as the director of the Mass Voters For Clean Elections and then as director of the Commonwealth Coalition. In 2006 he served as campaign manager for then Worcester Mayor Tim Murray's successful campaign for lieutenant governor.  From 2007-2009, O'Brien worked as district director for U.S. Congressman and Worcester resident Jim McGovern.

O'Brien launched a campaign for Mayor of Worcester in 2009. He faced off against incumbent Konstantina Lukes and City Councilor Kathleen Toomey. His campaign received support from Massachusetts Lieutenant Governor Tim Murray, himself a former mayor of the city. On November 3, 2009, O'Brien won the mayoral election with 50% of the vote and won all 50 of the city's precincts.

As mayor, O’Brien initiated and led a special Mayor's Task Force on Job Growth and Retention that created a comprehensive strategic plan for economic growth in the city. He also created the Mayor's Civic Academy to teach civic participation to community leaders and this model program has been continued by current Mayor Joe Petty. As Chair of the Worcester School Committee he spearheaded a comprehensive effort to address the capital needs of the city’s public schools that resulted in more than 13 million dollars of funding for school renovation and technology upgrades. He also created the Mayor’s Task Force on Latino Student Excellence to address the growing achievement gap for Latino students. To better support the city's growing immigrant population he helped launch the Mayor's Immigrant and Refugee Roundtable.

O'Brien aroused controversy by spearheading a boycott of Arizona due to its law regarding illegal immigration, Arizona SB 1070. He also supported a resolution made by the U.S. Conference of Mayors that called for the United States to pull its troops out of Afghanistan. O'Brien took stances on taxes, such as supporting shifting taxes from businesses to homeowners and raising the state income tax, that generated opposition.

O'Brien announced on September 16, 2011 that he would not seek reelection as mayor after he and his wife adopted two young children from Ethiopia. O'Brien then served for one term in an at-large seat on the City Council. He also returned to working for Congressman Jim McGovern as his political and finance director.

Joe is currently the political director of the Environmental League of Massachusetts Action Fund (ELM Action Fund). The ELM Action Fund helps pass laws that protect our environmental legacy, holds elected officials accountable, and works to build the political power of the environmental community. Joe is also an adjunct professor at Clark University in Worcester.

Personal life

O'Brien is a resident of the Main South neighborhood in the city of Worcester. He is married to Lisa Laurel Weinberg, a human rights attorney and they have two children. He currently serves on the board of several community-based organizations and is an active volunteer in his neighborhood.

References

1965 births
Living people
Mayors of Worcester, Massachusetts
Worcester, Massachusetts City Council members
Fordham University alumni
Harvard Kennedy School alumni
Massachusetts Democrats